Dompierre may refer to:

France
Dompierre, Oise
Dompierre, Orne
Dompierre, Vosges
Dompierre-aux-Bois, in the Meuse département
Dompierre-Becquincourt, in the Somme département
Dompierre-du-Chemin, in the Ille-et-Vilaine département
Dompierre-en-Morvan, in the Côte-d'Or département
Dompierre-les-Églises, in the Haute-Vienne département
Dompierre-les-Ormes, in the Saône-et-Loire département
Dompierre-les-Tilleuls, in the Doubs département
Dompierre-sous-Sanvignes, in the Saône-et-Loire département
Dompierre-sur-Authie, in the Somme département
Dompierre-sur-Besbre, in the Allier département
Dompierre-sur-Chalaronne, in the Ain département
Dompierre-sur-Charente, in the Charente-Maritime département
Dompierre-sur-Helpe, in the Nord département
Dompierre-sur-Héry, in the Nièvre département
Dompierre-sur-Mer, in the Charente-Maritime département
Dompierre-sur-Mont, in the Jura département
Dompierre-sur-Nièvre, in the Nièvre département
Dompierre-sur-Veyle, in the Ain département
Dompierre-sur-Yon, in the Vendée département

Switzerland
Dompierre, Fribourg
Dompierre, Vaud

See also
 Dampierre (disambiguation)
Joseph Théodore Dompierre